The Second Adenauer cabinet led by Konrad Adenauer was sworn in on 20 October 1953 after the 1953 elections. It laid down its function after the formation of the Cabinet Adenauer III on 29 October 1957, which was formed following the 1957 elections.

Composition

|-
|}

References

Adenauer II
Adenauer II
1953 establishments in West Germany
1957 disestablishments in West Germany
Cabinets established in 1953
Cabinets disestablished in 1957
C2